Idiomarina is a genus of bacteria in the Gammaproteobacteria class, including the sequenced species Idiomarina loihiensis.

Species
Many species are in this genus, including many not specifically identified:
I. abyssalis
I. aestuarii
I. aquatica
I. aquimaris
I. atlantica
I. baltica
I. donghaiensis
I. halophila
I. fontislapidosi
I. homiensis
I. indica
I. insulisalsae
I. loihiensis
I. marina
I. maris
I. maritima
I. piscisalsi
I. planktonica
I. ramblicola
I. salinarum
I. sediminum
I. seosinensis
I. tainanensis
I. taiwanensis
I. tyrosinivorans
I. woesei
I. xiamenensis
I. zobellii

References

Alteromonadales
Bacteria genera